Mostafa Sabri (born 13 February 1984) is an Iranian football player who plays for Fajr Sepasi of the Iran Pro League.

Professional
Sabri has played his entire career for Moghavemat Sepasi.

Club Career Statistics
Last Update  10 May 2013 

 Assist Goals

References

1984 births
Living people
Iranian footballers
Fajr Sepasi players
Saipa F.C. players
Sanat Naft Abadan F.C. players
Persian Gulf Pro League players
Association football defenders
People from Shiraz
Sportspeople from Fars province